Parvathaneni Upendra (14 July 1936 – 16 November 2009) was a Telugu Desam Party Union Cabinet Minister from Andhra Pradesh in India. He was born in Pothunuru village in West Godavari district, Andhra Pradesh.

Career
P. Upendra holds M. A. degree in English Literature, Post Graduate Diploma in Public Relations and Journalism from Andhra University, University College, Madras and Indian Institute Public Administration, New Delhi. He started as a journalist after graduation.

P. Upendra worked over two decades for Indian Railways as a Public Relations Officer before entering politics. He served as Personal Secretary to then Railways  Minister Madhu Dandavate between 1977 and 1979.

In 1982, he joined the Telugu Desam Party (TDP) led by the film actor-turned-politician N. T. Rama Rao. He was first elected to the Rajya Sabha in 1984 and continued as its member till 1996. He was designated as the Leader of the Opposition in the Lok Sabha during the prime ministership of Rajiv Gandhi (1984–1989).

An articulate politician, Upendra enjoyed cordial relations with many senior political leaders, cutting across party lines, at the national level. This had helped him become convenor of the National Front in 1988.

Upendra was the general secretary of the National Front and was minister for information and broadcasting and Parliamentary Affairs in V. P. Singh's cabinet. He oversaw the various parliamentary procedures that were essential to the first coalition government in India. He was also responsible for enacting the Prasar Bharati Act 1990. Together with George Fernandes he attempted to negotiate with RSS chief Madhukar Deoras on the Rath Yathra of L. K. Advani, but this was unsuccessful.

He was expelled from the TDP in March 1992 following differences with N. Chandrababu Naidu. After exit, Upendra spent a couple of years  as an "unattached" member in the Rajya Sabha before formally joining Congress  in 1994. He was elected to the Lok Sabha from Vijayawada in 1996 and re-elected in 1998.

P. Upendra, was more or less idle since 1999. He consistently maintained a stance opposing the Bharatiya Janata Party and parties like the TDP under Chandrababu Naidu that had allied with it. He quit ruling Congress party in November 2008 to join the Praja Rajyam Party (PRP) floated by actor-turned-politician Chiranjeevi. While joining the Praja Rajyam Party (PRP), he had said that the Congress leadership did not use his services either at the national level or in the state.

Mr. Upendra was instrumental in getting the first escalator in South Central Railway at Vijayawada Junction railway station. He also got Doordarshan Kendra for the city and paved the way for the removal of the Satyanarayanapuram railway track.

Upendra wrote a book Gatam Swagatam in two parts listing his political experience.

Personal life
Upendra married Vasundhara in 1956. They had three sons and one daughter. His eldest son P.V K Mohan is the senior most member of National Shipping Board, second son P Sarat Kumar and third son P. Vivekananda are part of Seaways Shipping Limited. His daughter Padmasri is married to former MP Lagadapati Rajagopal.

Death
Upendra died in Hyderabad on 16 November 2009 due to renal failure at the age of 73. He was on dialysis for five years following a kidney ailment.

Chief Minister K. Rosaiah, TDP president N. Chandrababu Naidu, PRP president Chiranjeevi and other leaders mourned his death.

References

External links 
 

1936 births
2009 deaths
Members of the Cabinet of India
V. P. Singh administration
People from West Godavari district
Lok Sabha members from Andhra Pradesh
India MPs 1996–1997
India MPs 1998–1999
Telugu Desam Party politicians
Telugu politicians
Indian National Congress politicians
Praja Rajyam Party politicians
Ministers for Information and Broadcasting of India
Rajya Sabha members from Andhra Pradesh